Lieutenant-Colonel Francis Cecil Campbell Balfour  (8 December 1884 – 16 April 1965) was a British military officer and colonial administrator.

The son of Colonel Eustace Balfour and Lady Frances Campbell, Balfour was a nephew of Arthur Balfour, who was Prime Minister of the United Kingdom from July 1902 to December 1905. He was educated at Eton College.

In 1906 he was appointed to the public works department of the Anglo-Egyptian Sudan, and in 1912 was appointed to the Sudan Political Service after the intervention of the Governor-General, Reginald Wingate.

Balfour joined the 6th Battalion, Northumberland Fusiliers, where he gained the rank of Lieutenant-Colonel. During the First World War he fought in Mesopotamia between 1917 and 1919, taking a leading role in defeating a rebellion in Najaf. 
From 1924 to 1926 he was Military Secretary to the Governor of Madras, George Goschen. From 1927 to 1928 he served as governor of the Red Sea Province of Sudan, and from 1929 to 1930 was Governor of the Mongalla Province of Sudan.

Balfour was decorated with the award of Order of the Nile (3rd class), the Military Cross and the award of Order of the Lion and the Sun of Persia (2nd class).
He was invested as a Companion of the Order of the Indian Empire (1919), as a Commander of the Order of the British Empire (1931) and as a Commander of the Royal Victorian Order (1953).
He died on 16 April 1965 at the age of eighty.

References

1884 births
1965 deaths
British colonial governors and administrators in Africa
Francis
Royal Northumberland Fusiliers officers
British Army personnel of World War I
Recipients of the Military Cross
Commanders of the Order of the British Empire
Commanders of the Royal Victorian Order
Companions of the Order of the Indian Empire
Anglo-Egyptian Sudan people
Turkish people of British descent
Turkish people of Egyptian descent
Turkish people of Scottish descent
Egyptian people of Scottish descent
Sudan Political Service officers